Otluca is a Turkish name and it can refer to

Otluca, a village in Artvin Province, Turkey
Otluca, a village in Batman Province, Turkey
Otluca, Ergani

See also
Otluca HES